A half volley in tennis is a shot that is hit immediately after the ball bounces but before it reaches the apex of its bounce. It is sometimes called an "on the rise shot", or "short hop".

Technique
The player who is hitting the half volley should not take a full backswing, but should still follow through.  The grip for this shot is a standard continental. Also, staying down when hitting the shot is very important, or else it will go long. This is the basic form for the volley, hence the name: half volley. The two parts of the tennis court where this shot is generally used are on the baseline and the service line.

Strategy
A half volley is a difficult shot to make. Often a player hits a half volley only when forced by the opponent or caught out of position. 

The half-volley came to prominence in the hands of George Caridia and Ernest Lewis in the early 1900s.
Arguably the greatest half-volleyer in history is John McEnroe; other professionals such as Stefan Edberg, Pete Sampras and Roger Federer had excellent half volleys that were used as weapons.

In his 1979 autobiography Jack Kramer devotes a page to the best tennis strokes he had ever seen.  He writes: "HALF-VOLLEY—Gonzales and Rosewall. Kenny had to learn to hit a half-volley because his serve was so weak that he had to pick up shots at his feet as he came to the net.  With his great serve, I don't know why Gorgo had to hit so many half-volleys, but he sure learned how."

External links

Video: Half volley

References

Tennis shots